The Bear Comes Home is a novel written by Rafi Zabor. It won the 1998 PEN/Faulkner Award for fiction.  It was selected as an alternate for the Hemingway Foundation/PEN Award.

Details
The novel tells the story of an alto saxophone-playing bear, his involvement in the jazz subculture, and his pursuit of love, truth and perfection.

Musician published the first chapters of The Bear Comes Home, in serialized form, beginning in 1979.  Zabor resumed work on the remainder of the book after a fourteen-year hiatus, and W. W. Norton published the novel in 1997.

References

External links 
The Bear Comes Home webpage at W. W. Norton & Company

1997 American novels
Novels first published in serial form
Works originally published in American magazines
Works originally published in music magazines
Books about bears
Novels about music
W. W. Norton & Company books
PEN/Faulkner Award for Fiction-winning works
1997 debut novels